Exsertotheca is a genus of mosses belonging to the family Neckeraceae.

Species:
 Exsertotheca baetica (J.Guerra, J.F.Jiménez & J.A.Jiménez) Draper, González-Mancebo, O.Werner, J.Patiño & Ros
 Exsertotheca crispa (Hedw.) S. Olsson, Enroth & D. Quandt 
 Exsertotheca intermedia (Brid.) S.Olsson, Enroth & D.Quandt

References

Neckeraceae
Moss genera